The Ball Game is an 1898 American short black-and-white silent documentary sports film produced and distributed by Edison Manufacturing Company. It was directed by William Heise.

Synopsis

The film contains footage of an 1898 baseball game between Reading Coal Heavers and the Newark Bears. The camera is situated twenty feet from the bag and a short extract of the game is then filmed.

Current status

Given its age, this short film is available to freely be downloaded from the Internet. It has also featured in a number of film collections including Diamonds on the Silver Screen.

References

External links 
 

1898 films
1890s short documentary films
1890s sports films
American short documentary films
American silent short films
American black-and-white films
Black-and-white documentary films
Documentary films about baseball
American baseball films
Baseball in the United States
Silent sports films